Performance is the first live album from Spacemen 3, documenting a set from the Perfect Prescription tour. It was recorded on February 6, 1988, at De Melkweg, Amsterdam, the Netherlands.

Track listing
Original release (Glass GLALP030)

LP versions omitted "Take Me to the Other Side"

1995 re-release (Taang! Records)

References

Spacemen 3 albums
1988 live albums
Glass Records live albums
Fire Records (UK) live albums
Taang! Records live albums